Ali Taheran (born April 7, 1997) is an Iranian footballer who last played for the Iranian club, Shahr Khodro as a midfielder.

Club career statistics

Honors 
 Tractor
Shohada Cup (1): 2017

References

Iranian footballers
Iran under-20 international footballers
Living people
1997 births
Tractor S.C. players
Association football forwards